The Cotorca is a left tributary of the river Ialomița in Romania. It discharges into the Ialomița in Urziceni.

References

Rivers of Romania
Rivers of Buzău County
Rivers of Ialomița County